James McGarry may refer to:
 James McGarry (hurler)
 James McGarry (footballer)